is a railway station in the city of Nasushiobara, Tochigi, Japan, operated by the East Japan Railway Company (JR East).

Lines

Station layout
This station has an elevated station building with one island platform and one side platform underneath; however, platform 2 is not in use. The station is staffed.

Platforms

History
Nishi-Nasuno Station opened on 1 October 1886. With the privatization of JNR on 1 April 1987, the station came under the control of JR East.

Passenger statistics
In fiscal 2019, the station was used by an average of 3740 passengers daily (boarding passengers only).

Buses

Surrounding area
Nishi-Nasuno Post Office
Former Nishi-Nasuno Town Hall
 
 
International University of Health and Welfare

See also
 List of railway stations in Japan

References

External links

 JR East station information 

Railway stations in Tochigi Prefecture
Tōhoku Main Line
Utsunomiya Line
Railway stations in Japan opened in 1886
Nasushiobara
Stations of East Japan Railway Company